The 1989 Supercopa Libertadores was the second edition of the Supercopa Libertadores, CONMEBOL's new international football club tournament. The competition was won by Boca Juniors, who clinched their first title by beating fellow Argentinian side, Independiente in the finals.

The competition was dominated by the Argentine teams, with three of the four semi-finalists coming from Argentina, namely, Boca Juniors, Independiente and Argentinos Juniors. The final between Boca Juniors and Independiente marked the first time in South American club history that both finalists in any competition had come from the same country. 

As the new reigning Copa Libertadores champions, Colombian side Atlético Nacional were admitted into the competition increasing the number of competitors to 14.

First round
The matches were played from 3 October to 10 October. Teams from the same nation could not be drawn against one another. Racing Club, as the title holders, entered the competition at the quarterfinal stage. Boca Juniors also advanced to that same stage after a draw of lots. 

|}
Boca Juniors received a bye to the quarter-finals

Quarter-finals
The matches were played from 18 October to 1 November.

|}

Semi-finals
The matches were played from 8 November to 16 November.

|}

Finals

|}

See also
1989 Copa Libertadores

References

Supercopa Libertadores
2